Johannes Fink (28 March 1895  – 1 June 1981) was a German general during World War II. He became a recipient of the Knight's Cross of the Iron Cross of Nazi Germany.

Awards and decorations

 Knight's Cross of the Iron Cross on 20 June 1940 as Oberst and Geschwaderkommodore of Kampfgeschwader 2
 German Cross in Gold on 1 October 1944 as Generalleutnant in the 2. Flieger-Division

References

Citations

Bibliography

1895 births
1981 deaths
Generals of Aviators
German Army personnel of World War I
German prisoners of war in World War II held by the United Kingdom
Luftwaffe World War II generals
Military personnel of Württemberg
People from the Kingdom of Württemberg
People from Reutlingen (district)
Recipients of the Gold German Cross
Recipients of the Knight's Cross of the Iron Cross
Military personnel from Baden-Württemberg